Monte Poro Lighthouse is an active lighthouse located on the summit of Monte Poro, in the south western part of Elba on the Tyrrhenian Sea, a region covered by Macchia Mediterranea. The place was of some strategic interest during World War II because close to the lighthouse are the ruins of a German position.

Description
The tower is mounted on a cylindrical equipment building similar to a pillbox because provided with a stepped embrasure. The equipment building and the tower are white, the lantern roof is grey metallic.

The lighthouse is completely automated and managed by the Arcipelago Toscano National Park with the identification code number 2054 E.F.

See also
 List of lighthouses in Italy

References

External links

 Servizio Fari Marina Militare

Lighthouses in Campo nell'Elba
Arcipelago Toscano National Park